Kwasi Owusu (5 November 1945 – 30 March 2020) was a Ghanaian footballer who played as a forward. He is the Ghana national team's third leading international goal scorer with 36 goals in over 130 appearances. He died aged 74, on 30 March 2020, in Sunyani.

Career statistics 
Scores and results list Ghana's goal tally first, score column indicates score after each Owusu goal.

References

External links
 

1945 births
2020 deaths
Ghanaian footballers
Association football forwards
Ghana international footballers
1970 African Cup of Nations players
Footballers at the 1972 Summer Olympics
Olympic footballers of Ghana
1976 African Cup of Nations players